Ronald Vernon Book (March 5 1937 – May 28, 1997 in Santa Barbara, California) was a theoretical computer scientist. He published more than 150 papers in scientific journals.
His papers are of great impact for computational complexity theory and term rewriting.

References

Further reading
. See also listing of Book's publications, pp. xxiii–xxxiv
. See also foreword by Maurice Nivat, pp. xiii–xiv, and listing of Book's publications, pp. 5–11.
.
.

External links
 
 

20th-century American mathematicians
1937 births
1997 deaths
Theoretical computer scientists
Harvard University alumni